The 2009–10 Welsh Premier League was the first season of the Welsh Premier Women's League, Wales' premier football league.

The first season was special, as there was no relegation. Swansea City Ladies won every match of the season, including a 4–0 victory in the final against Caernarfon Town, and qualified for the 2010–11 UEFA Women's Champions League.

Northern conference

Final standings

Results

Southern conference

Final standings

Results

Final

Notes

Wales Women
Women
2009-10
1